, was a Japanese Buddhist monk and second patriarch of the main Chinzei branch of the Jōdo-shū sect of Japanese Buddhism, after Hōnen. According to biographies, he first ordained as a priest of the Tendai sect at the age of fourteen, and entered Enryaku-ji temple in 1183. He first met Hōnen in 1197. Later, after Hōnen and many of his followers were exiled in 1207, Shōkō was exiled on the island of Kyūshū and taught the practice of the nembutsu there.

Unlike other disciples of Hōnen, Shōkō favored studying the more traditional Buddhist paths along with the Pure Land path. He also criticized the interpretations by other disciples of Hōnen, particularly Kōsai and Shōkū, who emphasized the nembutsu over other practices. However, unlike Chōsai, his teachings still emphasized repeated recitations of the nembutsu as the primary practice in Jōdo-shū. In the spectrum of followers of Hōnen, Benchō balances faith in the nembutsu with acceptance of other practices leading to rebirth in the Pure Land of Amida Buddha.

After Hōnen died, Benchō attempted to counter divergences in Hōnen's teachings among other disciples by writing a treatise titled , which contained a full account of the teachings that Benchō heard directly from Hōnen. He also wrote The Way of Practice for Birth by the Nembutsu (nembutsu ojo shugyomon) to counter teachings from other disciples of Hōnen, particularly Kōsai and the "single-nembutsu" movement.

Benchō died in 1238 and was succeeded by the third patriarch, Ryōchū (良忠, 1199–1287), who formally established Chinzei branch.

References

External links 
 The History of Honen's Disciples 
 The Jodo Shu official biography of Honen

1162 births
1238 deaths
Buddhist patriarchs
Japanese Buddhist clergy
Kamakura period Buddhist clergy